Richard Charles Motz (12 January 1940 – 29 April 2007) was a New Zealand cricketer. A right-arm fast bowler and hard-hitting lower order batsman, Motz played 32 Test matches for the New Zealand cricket team between 1961 and 1969. He was the first bowler for New Zealand to take 100 wickets in Test cricket.

Early life
Motz was born in Christchurch. He was educated at North New Brighton primary school and Linwood High School, excelling as an all-rounder at both. He also played rugby, tennis, badminton and golf. He played as full-back for the New Brighton rugby team for two years after leaving school.

Domestic career
He played domestic cricket for Canterbury, making his debut in the Plunket Shield in 1957, while still a schoolboy, taking 4 for 40 at his first outing. He made his reputation as a hostile fast bowler, and a big-hitting lower order batsman.

His best first-class performances were in New Zealand domestic cricket. He took 8 wickets for 61 runs against Wellington in 1966–67, and scored 103 not out against Otago in 1967–68, making his only first-class century inside an hour. On tour to Australia in 1967–68, he scored 94 against South Australia, including 76 runs from boundaries (6 sixes and 10 fours).

International career
He was one of five New Zealand players and seven South Africans to make their Test debut in the 1st Test at Durban in December 1961.  He took 81 wickets on the tour, at a bowling average of 19, including 19 wickets in the five Tests.

He took five wickets in an innings five times in Tests, once in England and twice at home against each of India and West Indies. He was also a handy lower-order batsman, scoring three Test half-centuries, all at home against England.

In 1968, he was the first bowler to be banned from bowling in a Test due to running on the wicket. In his last Test, the third Test against England at The Oval in August 1969, Motz became the first New Zealand bowler to take 100 Test wickets when he trapped Phil Sharpe leg before wicket (his only wicket of the match).

Motz was New Zealand Cricket Almanack Player of the Year in 1961, South African Cricket Annual Cricketer of the Year in 1962, and a Wisden Cricketer of the Year in 1966.

After cricket
Motz's playing career ended at the age of 29, after he was found to have a displaced vertebra – indeed, he had been playing with a bad back for over a year. After his retirement from cricket, he became a taxi driver. He also ran a sports business, and then ran a pub in Timaru.  In later years, he put on considerable weight, ending over 30 stone.

He was inducted to the New Zealand Sports Hall of Fame in 1997.

He was married twice. His first marriage, to cricketer Loretta Todd, ended in divorce in 1987.  They had a son and two daughters.  His son, Wayne, was murdered in 1989.  He remarried, to Josephine Cole.

He died in Christchurch. He was found dead at his home by his former captain, Graham Dowling.   He was survived by his two daughters from his first marriage.

References

External links
 
 

Canterbury cricketers
New Zealand Test cricketers
New Zealand cricketers
Wisden Cricketers of the Year
1940 births
2007 deaths
New Zealand rugby union players
People educated at Linwood College
D. H. Robins' XI cricketers
South Island cricketers